The General Union of Education Personnel (ABOP) was a trade union representing workers in the education sector in the Netherlands.

The union was founded in 1966, when the Dutch Teachers' Association merged with the Dutch Association of Industrial Education Teachers.  In 1971, it affiliated to the Dutch Confederation of Trade Unions, and then from 1981 to its successor, the Federation of Dutch Trade Unions.  In 1982, it had 41,833 members, and this grew to 52,343 in 1995.  At the start of 1997, it merged with the Dutch Association of Teachers, to form the General Education Union.

Presidents
1966: Evert Steenbergen
1976: Jan van den Bosch
1988: Ella Vogelaar
1994: Jacques Tichelaar

References

Education trade unions
Trade unions established in 1966
Trade unions disestablished in 1997
Trade unions in the Netherlands